Hyposmocoma cristata is a species of moth of the family Cosmopterigidae. It was first described by Arthur Gardiner Butler in 1881. It is endemic to the Hawaiian islands of Oahu, Molokai and Hawaii. The type locality is the mountains near Honolulu.

This species is often abundant.

The larvae feed on Freycinetia species. The slender, white larvae bore in the pith of dead stems of their host. Pupation takes place within the burrows.

External links

cristata
Endemic moths of Hawaii
Moths described in 1881